The Regency Media Group is Privately held Australian business. It has been producing media for the Australian entertainment industry since the mid-1950s. The corporation has developed into Australasia's most seasoned business under a single management structure, locally owned electronic media manufacturing business.

Regency has grown over the past 50 years to become a multifaceted company that produces and distributes digital media.

Regency also owns a 74% stake in a joint venture in India with Sa Re Ga Ma to produce Compact Discs, Video CDs, and DVDs in that market.  Sa Re Ga Ma is the oldest music company in India with its origins dating back to the late 1800s.  It has interests in Bollywood movies and music content.

In August 2010, Regency acquired Shock Entertainment, one of the largest independent distributors of film, TV and music content in Australia.  In 2012 Shock DVD changed name to Regency Home Entertainment, and has licensing and distribution deals with partners such as WWE, CBS, E!, and Time–Life.  The company also launched Regency Film Distribution, in June 2012.

Shock Records represents prestigious labels such as Cooking Vinyl, Vagrant Records, and Eagle Vision.  As part of the acquisition Regency now has access to a large catalogue in Australia as well as the infrastructure and a specialist team with skills in content acquisition and management.  The acquisition of Shock represents the first pillar of the Company's committed strategy to be a vertically integrated media company.

References

External links
 

Film distributors of Australia
Home video distributors
Mass media companies of Australia